Orlando Enrique Aravena Vergara (born 21 October 1942) is a Chilean former footballer and manager.

Aravena coached the Chile national team during the 1987 Copa América, where the team reached the tournament final. He ended his international career as team manager during Chile's qualification attempt for the 1990 FIFA World Cup.

Aravena received a 5-year ban from FIFA for his part in a plan to have a World Cup qualifying game awarded to Chile. He had ordered goalie Roberto Rojas to feign injury after Rojas was almost hit by an incendiary device thrown onto the pitch at Estádio do Maracanã.

Honours

International
Chile
 Copa América runner-up: 1987

References

1942 births
Living people
Chilean footballers
Chile international footballers
Colo-Colo footballers
Ñublense footballers
Magallanes footballers
Deportes La Serena footballers
Club Deportivo Palestino footballers
Chilean Primera División players
Chilean football managers
Chilean Primera División managers
Colo-Colo managers
Ñublense managers
Club Deportivo Universidad Católica managers
O'Higgins F.C. managers
Unión Española managers
Rangers de Talca managers
Everton de Viña del Mar managers
Club Deportivo Palestino managers
Chile national football team managers
Santiago Morning managers
Association football midfielders
People from Talca
Chile national under-20 football team managers